Here's Berlin or Hello Berlin, Paris Calling is a 1932 French-German romantic comedy film directed by Julien Duvivier and starring Josette Day, Germaine Aussey and Wolfgang Klein. It was shot at the Johannisthal Studios in Berlin. The film's sets were designed by the art director Erich Czerwonski.

Cast
 Josette Day as Lily
 Germaine Aussey as Annette
 Wolfgang Klein as Erich
 Karel Štěpánek as Max
 Charles Redgie as Jacques Dumont
 Hans Henninger as Karl
 Georges Boulanger as Le président de la république transocéanienne
 Albert Broquin as Le guide
 Heinrich Lisson as Minor Role
 Marthe Mussine
 Pierre Piérade
 Ellen Plessow
 Gustav Püttjer as Le musicien arabe
 Émile Saint-Ober

References

Bibliography

External links 
 

1932 films
Films of the Weimar Republic
French romantic comedy films
German romantic comedy films
1932 romantic comedy films
1930s French-language films
1930s German-language films
Films directed by Julien Duvivier
German black-and-white films
French black-and-white films
1932 multilingual films
French multilingual films
German multilingual films
1930s French films
1930s German films
Films shot at Johannisthal Studios